Fiji–Malaysia relations refers to bilateral foreign relations between Fiji and Malaysia. Fiji has a high commission in Kuala Lumpur, which is also accredited to Brunei, the Philippines and Singapore, and Malaysia has a high commission in Suva.

History 
Both countries were part of the British Empire and have long-standing relations due to many Fijian soldiers serving in Peninsular Malaysia during the Malayan Emergency from 1952 to 1956. In 1971, the first Prime Minister of Fiji, Ratu Sir Kamisese Mara, visited Malaysia then diplomatic relations were established in 1977. The Malaysian High Commission in Suva was established in 1984 while the Fijian High Commission in Kuala Lumpur been established in 1988.

Economic and security relations 
Fiji currently seeks technical assistance from Malaysia in the areas of agriculture, development of small medium enterprises, fisheries, forestry and to improving manufacturing base of Fiji. Fiji also seeks assistance on the renewable energy projects and infrastructural development. The country also considering marketing and promotion of Fiji products in Malaysia and the rest of Asia which is imperative on the tourism sector. There is also plan for a direct air link to Malaysia which would be benefits to boost to the Fijian tourism sector and both countries have a relations in military officers training, education, and air services. In 2011, a Fiji-Malaysia business council has been launched.

See also  
 Foreign relations of Fiji 
 Foreign relations of Malaysia

References 

 
Malaysia
Fiji
Malaysia
Fiji